The White Raven is a 1998 action crime thriller directed by Jakub Z. Rucinski and Andrew Stevens and starring Ron Silver, Joanna Pacuła and Roy Scheider. The film is based on the novel of the same name by Michael Blodgett.

External links

1998 films
1998 action thriller films
American action thriller films
American crime thriller films
Films based on American novels
Films based on thriller novels
Films shot in Poland
American independent films
1990s English-language films
Films directed by Andrew Stevens
1990s American films